Praiwet Wanna (Thai ไปรเวท วันนา; born May 23, 1983), simply known as Ti, is a Thai professional footballer who plays as a midfielder.

Career
He played for club side Rayong United in 2013
and played for Uttaradit in 2016.

Honours
Thailand U20
 AFF U-20 Youth Championship: 2002

References

1983 births
Living people
Praiwet Wanna
Praiwet Wanna
Praiwet Wanna
Association football midfielders
Praiwet Wanna